The Yeshurun Central Synagogue was the first synagogue to be built in Gedera, Israel during the time of the Biluim, forerunners of the kibbutz movement 1882 from the Russian Empire. Before the synagogue was built, the first settlers used a shack as a synagogue. The synagogue was built on the same exact spot.

Yeshurun or Jeshurun is a poetic name for Israel, the Land of Israel, or the Patriarch Jacob

See also
 History of the State of Israel
 List of synagogues in Israel

References

31°49'4"N, 34°46'36"E

Orthodox synagogues in Israel
Buildings and structures in Central District (Israel)
Gedera
Synagogues completed in 1912
Russian-Jewish culture in Israel
1912 establishments in the Ottoman Empire